Doetinchem is a railway station located in Doetinchem, Netherlands. The station was opened on 15 July 1885 and is located on the Winterswijk–Zevenaar railway. The station is operated by Arriva and Breng. In Doetinchem there is also Doetinchem De Huet railway station to the west of this station. From 1885 to 1937, it was also the start of the branch to Ruurlo. From Doetinchem station it is a 10-minute walk north to the town centre. In a Railpro survey in 2005, there were approximately 3590 passengers per day using Doetinchem station.

Train services

Bus services

References

External links

NS website 
Dutch Public Transport journey planner 
Arriva Gelderland website 
Arriva Achterhoek Network Map 

Railway stations in Doetinchem
Railway stations opened in 1885
1885 establishments in the Netherlands
Railway stations in the Netherlands opened in the 19th century